Willow Creek-Lurline Wildlife Management Area is located in the Sacramento Valley of California. The landscape is very flat, bordered by the Sierra and Coast ranges and surrounded by intensive agriculture (rice and other grains). The objective of this wildlife management area is to protect fall/winter habitat for waterfowl through the acquisition of conservation easements on privately owned wetlands. It is not open to the public.

Central Valley wetlands are critical for Pacific Flyway waterfowl, with 44 percent wintering in the Sacramento Valley. As wetlands of the Central Valley have been lost (95 percent over the last 100 years), waterfowl have become increasingly dependent on the remaining wetlands in the Sacramento Valley.

References
Area website

External links
 Willow Creek-Lurline Wildlife Management Area website
 Willow Creek Wildlife Area, Lassen County, California

National Wildlife Refuges in California
Wetlands of California
California Department of Fish and Wildlife areas
Protected areas of Colusa County, California
Geography of the Sacramento Valley
Natural history of the Central Valley (California)
1985 establishments in California
Protected areas established in 1985